The 1939 Campeonato Nacional de Fútbol Profesional was Chilean first tier's 7th season. Colo-Colo was the tournament's champion, winning its second title.

First stage

Scores

Standings

Second stage

Scores

Standings

Third stage

Scores

Standings

Final standings

Topscorer

References

External links
ANFP 
RSSSF Chile 1939

Primera División de Chile seasons
Primera
Chile